The Last of the Fast Guns is a 1958 American Western film directed by George Sherman and written by David P. Harmon. The film stars Jock Mahoney, Gilbert Roland, Linda Cristal, Eduard Franz, Lorne Greene and Carl Benton Reid. The film was released in July 1958, by Universal Pictures.

Plot
A U.S. tycoon hires an 1880s gunfighter to find his brother in Mexico.

Cast       
 Jock Mahoney as Brad Ellison
 Gilbert Roland as Miles Lang
 Linda Cristal as Maria O'Reilly
 Eduard Franz as Padre Jose
 Lorne Greene as Michael O'Reilly
 Carl Benton Reid as John Forbes
 Edward Platt as Samuel Grypton
 Eduardo Noriega as Cordoba
 Jorge Treviño as Manuel
 Rafael Alcayde as Alcalde
 Lee Morgan as Johnny Ringo
 Milton Bernstein as James Younger
 Stillman Segar as Ben Thompson
 José Chávez as Garcia
 Francisco Reiguera as Pablo
 Richard H. Cutting as Sheriff
 Ralph Neff as Bartender

References

External links
 

1958 films
1958 Western (genre) films
American Western (genre) films
Films set in Mexico
Films shot in Mexico
Universal Pictures films
Films directed by George Sherman
1950s English-language films
1950s American films